Boucott-Diembéring is a village in the rural community of Diembéring, Cabrousse, Oussouye, Ziguinchor, Casamance.

Populated places in Ziguinchor Region